Panchalam is a village in Viluppuram district, Tamil Nadu, India, to the south line of Chennai Suburban Railway.
 

Villages in Viluppuram district